Michael Byers may refer to:
 Michael Byers (American academic), American writer and professor of English
 Michael Byers (Canadian author), professor at the University of British Columbia, and expert on international law
 Michael Byers (actor), actor from Northern Ireland
 Mike Byers (1946–2010), ice hockey player